Clube Esportivo Rio Branco, usually known simply as Rio Branco (or Rio Branco-RJ) is a Brazilian football team from the city of Campos dos Goytacazes, Rio de Janeiro state, founded on November 5, 1912.

History
On November 5, 1912, the club was founded by youngsters after the Baron of Rio Branco, who died in the same year. The team participated on the Campeonato Brasileiro Série C once, in 2003.

Titles
Campeonato Fluminense: 1961
Campeonato Carioca Terceira Divisão: 1984
Campeonato Carioca Módulo Especial: 2001
Campeonato da Cidade de Campos: 1917, 1928, 1929, 1931, 1949, 1958, 1961, 1962

Stadium
The home stadium Estádio Milton Barbosa is also known as Calabouço (meaning dungeon).

Colors
The official colors are pink and black.

References

External links
 Clube Esportivo Rio Branco's official website
 Rio Branco at FFERJ

Association football clubs established in 1912
Football clubs in Rio de Janeiro (state)
1912 establishments in Brazil